Mažeikiai District Municipality is located in the north-west of Lithuania, on the River Venta in Telšiai County. The administrative center of Mažeikiai District is the city of Mažeikiai. There is one urban and 8 rural elderates. In 2003, the population was 67,393. Of this number, 46,223 live in towns and 21,170 in villages.

It is situated in northern Samogitia. Mažeikiai District borders with the Republic of Latvia in the north, with Akmenė District Municipality in the east, with Telšiai District Municipality in the southeast, with Plungė District Municipality in the southwest and with Skuodas District Municipality in the west. Petraičiai village is the westernmost settlement, with Kalniškiai and Pakliaupė villages being the easternmost settlements. The northernmost is Giniočiai, while the southernmost is Pasruojė.

Mažeikiai District Municipality is one of the more populous administrative district municipalities (municipalities, covering mostly rural regions and smaller towns rather than major cities). The region is crossed by important railway lines: Liepāja (Republic of Latvia) – Šiauliai – Kaunas – Vilnius and Riga (Republic of Latvia) – Mažeikiai – Klaipėda. However, they are currently no longer used for passenger transportation.

Nature and Cultural heritage

References

External links
Official website
Lithuanian postcode directory

 
Municipalities of Telšiai County
Municipalities of Lithuania